Albinaria menelaus is a species of air-breathing land snail, a terrestrial pulmonate gastropod mollusk in the family Clausiliidae, the door snails. The species is endemic to Greece and only known from the southern Peloponnese.

References

Albinaria
Gastropods described in 1873
Taxa named by Eduard von Martens
Endemic fauna of Greece
Molluscs of Europe